Churra is a hamlet belonging to the municipality of Murcia (Spain), with a municipal board. It is a semi-agricultural town, although in recent years it has opened its economy to industry, and especially the service sector (commerce), with two hypermarkets (Thader and Nueva Condomina). It had a population of 4,912 inhabitants (Instituto Nacional de Estadística (Spain) in 2004) and an area of 5.6 square kilometers. The distance to Murcia city center is 3.5 kilometers, served with a tram, and lies at an altitude of 57 meters above sea level.

It was founded during the Islamic domination around the ninth century and since then its history has always been closely linked to that of Murcia, becoming in this hamlet of the eighteenth century. There are vestiges of its history in the village, such as the New and Old Ditches and Torre Alcayna House.

External links

 Churra (in Spanish).

References
 Merino Álvarez, Abelardo. Geografía histórica de la provincial de Murcia. Consejo Superior de Investigaciones Científicas.
 Calvo García-Tornel, Francisco. Geografía humana de Murcia. Olkos-Tau Ediciones.

Populated places in the Region of Murcia
Localities of Spain